University of Art & Social Sciences was a private university in Chile. It was founded on 1982 and the headquarters were in Santiago de Chile.

Educational institutions established in 1982
Santiago de Chile
1982 establishments in Chile
Educational institutions disestablished in 2021
2021 disestablishments in Chile